Thierry Bernardi Modo Abouna (born May 20, 1981, in Yaoundé, Cameroon) is a retired Cameroonian soccer player.

He played in various countries throughout his career, including for RCD Mallorca of Spain, AEL of Greece, Bahlinger SC of Germany and  Villemomble Sports of France.

He  played for the Cameroon national football team U-20 appearing in the 1999 FIFA U-20 World Cup.

References

External links
 sportscameroon.blogspot.com
 
 foot-national.com
 footmercato.net

1981 births
Living people
Footballers from Yaoundé
Cameroonian footballers
Cameroon youth international footballers
Athlitiki Enosi Larissa F.C. players
Canon Yaoundé players
Tonnerre Yaoundé players
RCD Mallorca players
Villemomble Sports players
Cameroon under-20 international footballers
Cameroonian expatriate footballers
Expatriate footballers in Spain
Expatriate footballers in Greece
Expatriate footballers in Germany
Expatriate footballers in France
Cameroonian expatriate sportspeople in Spain
Cameroonian expatriate sportspeople in Greece
Cameroonian expatriate sportspeople in Germany
Cameroonian expatriate sportspeople in France
Association football forwards
Bahlinger SC players